The short-legged snake skink (Ophiomorus brevipes) is a species of skink, a lizard in the family Scincidae. The species is from Afghanistan, Pakistan, and Iran.

References

Ophiomorus
Taxa named by William Thomas Blanford
Reptiles described in 1874